Thermospermine synthase (TSPMS, ACL5 (ACAULIS5), SAC51) is an enzyme with systematic name S-adenosylmethioninamine:spermidine 3-aminopropyltransferase (thermospermine synthesizing). This enzyme catalyses the following chemical reaction

 S-adenosylmethioninamine + spermidine  S-methyl-5'-thioadenosine + thermospermine + H+

This enzyme is required for correct xylem specification through regulation of the lifetime of the xylem elements.

References

External links 

EC 2.5.1